Bespopovtsy ("priestless ones") are Priestless Old Believers that reject Nikonite priests. They are one of the two major strains of Old Believers.

Priestless Old Believers may have evolved into the first Spiritual Christians which were divided into various and diverse tribal sects including: Pomortsy, Fedoseyans, Filippians, Beguny ("Runners"), Netovtsy/Netovshchina, and many others. Some reject priests and a number of church rites, such as the Eucharist, believing that any priest or hierarch who has used the Nikonite Rites has forfeited apostolic succession. Others still believe in the existence of a priesthood, but happen to find themselves without priests. Many such sects have historically received Nikonite priests that have publicly repented from the reforms of Patriarch Nikon.

Sources
 Crummey, Robert O. The Old Believers & The World Of Antichrist; The Vyg Community & The Russian State, Wisconsin U.P., 1970.
 Zenkovsky, Serge A. "The ideology of the Denisov brothers", Harvard Slavic Studies, 1957. III, 49–66.

See also
 Popovtsy, another major strain of Old Believers, the ones who accept priests.

Old Believer movement